This is a list of satellites operated by Intelsat Corporation.

Intelsat brand

Generations 1-4 (1965–1978)

Generations 5-6 (1980–1991)

Generations 7-10 (1993–2004)

Rebranded PanAmSat constellation (1994–2007)

Recent spacecraft (since 2009)

Other brands

References 

Intelsat